The Faculty of Engineering is one of the eight faculties at Lund University in Lund, Sweden, commonly called LTH (after its Swedish name Lunds Tekniska Högskola). LTH has (2022) about 1,500 employees and nearly 10,000 students, of which about 650 graduate annually. LTH currently offers 16 engineering programmes, 5 higher engineering programmes and 19 international master's programmes. LTH trains civil engineers, fire engineers, architects, industrial designers and doctors of technology. LTH's higher education engineering programmes take place at Campus Helsingborg. LTH also offers a unique education in risk management and professional training in food technology. Since 2010, LTH has also been responsible for the bachelor's programme for airline pilots. The civil engineering programmes were changed in autumn 2007 as a step in the Bologna process and are now 5 years long, equivalent to 300 credits. First-cycle courses are as a rule offered in Swedish, while higher-level courses are often taught in English with English literature.

History 
Lund University of Technology, LTH, was founded in 1961 and incorporated in 1969 as part of Lund University. The university originally consisted of six sections, Engineering Physics, Mechanical Engineering, Electrical Engineering, Civil Engineering, Chemical Engineering and Architecture. Carin Boalt became Lunds first female professor on her appointment as a professor of Building Function Analysis in 1964.

The range of courses has developed over time and now includes Computer Engineering and Biotechnology as well as Fire Engineering, Ecosystem Engineering, Industrial Economics and Industrial Design. LTH is located on its own campus where most of the buildings were designed by Klas Anshelm. Since 1995, LTH has also been running higher education engineering programmes in Building Technology and Computer/Electrical Engineering at Campus Helsingborg. LTH has its own dean since 1990. These have been Bertil Törnell (1990-1993), Sven Lindblad (1993-1996), Thomas Johannesson (1996-2001), Gunilla Jönson (2002-2007), Anders Axelsson (2008-2014), Viktor Öwall (2015-2020) and Annika Olsson (2021- ).

Programmes

Architecture, 300 credits, 5 years

Fire engineering 210 hp

Bachelor of Engineering, 300 credits, 5 years 

 Biotechnology
 Computer Science and engineering
 Environmental engineering
 Electrical Engineering
 Industrial Engineering and Management
 Information and Communication Engineering Technologies
 Chemical Engineering
 Surveying and Land Management
 Biomedical Engineering
 Mechanical Engineering
 Mechanical Engineering with Industrial Design
 Risk, safety and crisis management
 Engineering Physics
 Engineering Mathematics
 Engineering Nanoscience
 Civil engineering

Engineering programmes, 180 credits, 3 years 
All higher engineering programmes are taught at Campus Helsingborg.

 Civil Engineering with Architecture
 Civil Engineering - Railway Engineering
 Civil Engineering - Road and Traffic Engineering
 Computer Engineering
 Electrical Engineering with Automation Technology

Risk Management, 120 credits. 
After two and a half years on the civil engineering programme of your choice or the fire engineering programme at LTH, you can choose to take the final part of the risk management programme.

Bachelor's programme in air traffic management, 180 credits

Bachelor's programme in industrial design, 180 credits

Bachelor's programme in food technology, 180 hp

Preparatory Semester, Basic Technical Year

Master's degree programmes, 120 credits, 2 years 

 Architecture
 Biotechnology
 Digital Architecture and Emergent Futures
 Disaster Risk Management and Climate Change Adaptation
 Embedded Electronics Engineering
 Energy-efficient and Environmental Building Design
 Food Technology and Nutrition
 Industrial Design
 Logistics and Supply Chain Management
 Machine Learning, Systems and Control
 Nanoscience
 Pharmaceutical Technology: Discovery, Development and Production
 Photonics
 Production and Materials Engineering
 Sustainable Energy Engineering
 Sustainable Urban Design
 Virtual Reality and Augmented Reality
 Water Resources Engineering
 Wireless Communication

Erasmus+ International Master's programmes 

 Food Innovation and Product Design
 Fire Safety Engineering
 Large Scale Accelerators and Lasers

Joint degree programmes 

 EIT Master's in Food Systems

Spin-off companies 
Here are some of the companies started based on research at the university. Several of them are located in the nearby research village of Ideon.

 Acconeer AB
 Bioinvent
 Cognimatics
 Decuma
 glo AB
 NEMS
 Immunovia
 Obducat
 Polar Rose
 Prefood
 Qlucore
 QuNano
 Sol Voltaics

See also
Chalmers University of Technology
KTH Royal Institute of Technology
List of universities in Sweden

Notes and references

External links
Faculty of Engineering, LTH - Official site
 Top Industrial Managers for Europe (TIME) network

University departments in Sweden
Lund University
Engineering universities and colleges in Sweden